Mathieu Lindon (born 9 August 1955 in Caen) is a French journalist and writer. He is the youngest son of the publisher  (who discovered Marguerite Duras and died in 2001), and the first cousin of actor Vincent Lindon. He won the Médicis Prize in 2011.

Biography 
He spent his youth in a wealthy secularized family of Jewish origins with family connections with the Citroën family. His father was a well-known publisher (Éditions de Minuit), highly esteemed by left wing and New Wave intellectuals. Mathieu Lindon was a close friend of Michel Foucault with whom he lived and spent most of his time between 1978 and 1984, without being his lover. He was also friend of writer Hervé Guibert with whom he won a scholarship at Villa Medicis in Rome between 1987 and 1989. Hervé Guibert recorded it in L'Incognito, published in 1989.

From the 1980s, Mathieu Lindon has been a journalist at Libération, a left-wing daily. He wrote a pamphlet against Jean-Marie Le Pen in 1998. He is openly gay, and his work deals often with gay themes.

Bibliography 
 1983 : Nos plaisirs, under the name Pierre-Sébastien Heudaux, Éditions de Minuit.
 1986 : Le Livre de Jim Courage, POL
 1987 : Prince et Léonardours, POL
 1987 : L'Homme qui vomit, POL
 1993 : Je t'aime. Récits critiques, Minuit.
 1994 : Champion du monde, POL
 1994 : Le Cœur de To, POL
 1996 : Merci, POL
 1998 : Les Apeurés, POL
 1998 : Le Procès de Jean-Marie Le Pen, POL
 2000 : Chez qui habitons-nous ?, POL
 2001 : La Littérature, POL
 2002 : Lâcheté d'Air France, POL
 2004 : Ma catastrophe adorée, POL
 2004 : Je vous écris, POL
 2006 : Ceux qui tiennent debout, POL
 2009 : En enfance, POL
 2011 : Ce qu'aimer veut dire, POL, Prix Médicis 2011.
 2013 : Une vie pornographique, POL, Prix du zorba 2013.
 2021 : Hervelino, POL

Notes

See also 
 Mathieu Lindon on P.O.L's official site
 David Caron, University of Michigan, Sex and Drugs and Literature, about Ce qu'aimer veut dire

1955 births
Living people
French gay writers
French male journalists
French people of Polish-Jewish descent
Prix Médicis winners
French male non-fiction writers
Writers from Caen